The Professional Squash Association (PSA) is the governing body for the men's and women's professional squash circuit. The body operates in a similar fashion to the ATP and the WTA for tennis. The PSA's highest professional level, the PSA World Tour involves over 200 tournaments annually around the world. Over 800 players from all the 5 continents (over 60 different countries represented ) are registered with the PSA and rankings are updated monthly based on players' performances.

PSA Tours
There are hundreds of PSA tournaments throughout the course of a season, and they are classified into the following categories, based on prize money:
 World Tour (The most important tournaments in prize money for more experienced and higher-ranked players, including the World Championship and PSA World Series Finals).
 Challenger Tour (Challenger tournaments are entry point for young and or up and coming professionals progressing through to a more international level of competition). Tournaments start with a total of $6,000:
 Satellite Tour (Closed Satellite tournaments can either be National Closed Championships or a tournament/series of tournaments whose entry is restricted to members of an association that promotes the tournament).

PSA World Tour
PSA World Tour (formerly PSA World Series) comprises the most important tournaments in prize money for more experienced and higher-ranked players, including PSA World Championships and PSA World Tour Finals, labelled as following:
PSA World Tour Platinum — 48-player draws — $165,000
PSA World Tour Gold — 24-player draws — $97,500–$100,000
PSA World Tour Silver — 24-player draws — $67,500–$70,000
PSA World Tour Bronze — 24-player draws — $45,000–$47,500

Every year, the top eight performers compete in the PSA World Series Finals. The eight players are separated into two groups of four, and play a round robin. The top two from each group advance to the semifinals (A1 vs. B2 and B1 vs. A2). The winner of the event is crowned World Series champion.

PSA Challenger Tour
PSA Challenger Tour' tournaments offer a $6,000–$30,000 prize-money, ideal circuit for less-experienced and upcoming players, that include the following tiers:
PSA Challenger Tour 30 — $30,000
PSA Challenger Tour 20 — $20,000
PSA Challenger Tour 10 — $12,000
PSA Challenger Tour 5 — $6,000
PSA Challenger Tour 3 — $3,000 (starting August 2020)

Satellite Tour
Satellite tournaments can either be National Closed Championships or a tournament/series of tournaments whose entry is restricted to members of an association that promotes the tournament.

History
In January 2013, the PSA announced, along with U.S. Squash, the creation of a new tournament series called the US Pro Squash Series. This tournament series is used to support marketing activities for tournaments in the United States.

In November 2014, the WSA and the PSA announced a historic merger between the two associations. A decision was reached to designate the PSA operate as the governing body for both the women's and men's ranks from January 1, 2015.

On December 7, 2020, the PSA reached an agreement with Dunlop that extends Dunlop's tenure as the provider of official balls and official racquets for the PSA. The extension is three years.

World Rankings
PSA publishes weekly rankings of professional players: PSA World Rankings (commonly known as the ‘World rankings’).

Current men's rankings

Current women's rankings

Current Champions

Current men's champions

Current women's champions

Video game

A PSA-licensed video game titled PSA World Tour Squash 2015 has been developed and published by Alternative Software, and is released only in various European countries on May 22, 2015, exclusively for Nintendo's Wii console. The game features the likeness of several professional squash players such as Nick Matthew, Amr Shabana, Grégory Gaultier, Ramy Ashour, and many others, and takes place in many iconic, global squash courts. Players can compete in main World Tour, or set up their own tournaments with using custom player avatars and stats. The game also supports Wii MotionPlus, allowing users an enhanced, real-time squash motion control gameplay experience, (Official website) and is the last ever game for the console to do so.

See also
PSA World Tour records
Official Men's Squash World Ranking
Official Women's Squash World Ranking
World Squash Federation
PSA Awards
Women's Squash Association
Squash TVPSA World Tour Platinum events are a select group of high-profile squash tournaments easily recognised (they offer the largest prize money and attract the majority of the world's best players).''
 World Championship''' (This is the ultimate tournament on the World Tour and to become World Champion is regarded the highest pinnacle of competitive achievement amongst PSA players. With a 64-person draw, this tournament is the most physically and mentally challenging of the season).

References

External links
Official PSA Website
PSA World Rankings

International organisations based in the United Kingdom
International sports organizations
Squash
Organisations based in West Yorkshire
Sport in West Yorkshire
Squash organizations
 Squash players